George Wishart may refer to:

 George Wishart (c.1513–1546), Scottish Protestant Reformer
 George Wishart (bishop) (1599–1671), Scottish Anglican bishop and author
 George Wishart (moderator) (1703–1785), Scottish minister
 George Wishart Anderson (1913–2002), British theologian